Roomano is a hard Gouda-like cheese from Friesland in the northern Netherlands. The major difference with Gouda is the percentage of butterfat in the cheese: Gouda contains 48% butterfat or more, while Roomano contains less than 48% butterfat. It is made from cow's milk, and is typically aged for four or more years. The cheese's flavor is very complex, salty and sweet with hints of butterscotch or toffee. It pairs well with aged sherries, port or Belgian-style ales. Roomano is a rare cheese to find, even in the Netherlands. It is often confused with the Italian cheese Romano.

See also

 List of cheeses

References

Dutch cheeses
Cow's-milk cheeses